Taliabo (Taliabu) is a Malayo-Polynesian language spoken on the island of the same name in the Moluccas of Indonesia.

Dialects are: 
Kadai
Padang (Samala)
Mananga
Mangei (Soboyo)

There are two linguistic strata in Taliabo, Central Maluku and Celebic, and it is not yet clear which group it belongs to.

Phonology

Consonants 

Vowels

References

Further reading

 

Central Maluku languages
Languages of the Maluku Islands